Lonesome Places is a collection of fantasy and horror short stories by American author August Derleth. It was released in 1962 by Arkham House in an edition of 2,201 copies and was Derleth's fifth collection of weird tales.  The collection contains the stories that Derleth believed to be his best of the preceding 15 years.

Contents

Lonesome Places contains the following tales:

 "The Lonesome Place"
 "Pikeman"
 "Kingsridge 214"
 "The Ebony Stick"
 "'Sexton, Sexton, in the Wall'"
 "The Closing Door"
 "A Room in a House"
 "Potts' Triumph"
 "Twilight Play"
 "The Disc Recorder"
 "Hector"
 "'Who Shall I Say is Calling?'"
 "The Extra Child"
 "The Place in the Woods"
 "Hallowe'en for Mr. Faulkner"
 "House—With Ghost"
 "The Slayers and the Slain"
 "The Dark Boy"

Sources

1962 short story collections
Fantasy short story collections
Horror short story collections